Gleed is a surname. Notable people with the surname include:

 Danuta Gleed (1946–1996), Canadian writer
 Edward C. Gleed (1916–1990), American fighter pilot
 Ian Gleed (1916–1943), British flying ace
 Jason Gleed, Canadian musician, songwriter, and producer
 Jon Gleed (born 1984), Canadian ice hockey player
 Philip K. Gleed (1834–1897), American attorney and politician
 Robert Gleed (1836–1916), American politician